A smaller influx of Lake Orsasjön is the Oreälven in Sweden with  a length of approx. 110 kilometres. The river has an extensive set of salmons and the water quality is class I. Many  athletes like to use the river for rafting purposes.

References

Rivers of Dalarna County
Dalälven basin